People Against Bureaucracy  (PAB) is a minor political party in Cheltenham, Gloucestershire. It was founded in 1976 to elect councillors to Tewkesbury Borough Council, later representing the same areas at Cheltenham Borough Council following council boundary changes. It describes itself as being opposed to 'party political' politics, and supportive of measures to make local government more transparent.

The group currently hold seats at the parish and borough level and are the joint third largest political group in Cheltenham along with the Green Party, and behind the Liberal Democrats and the Conservatives. PAB's two councillors on Cheltenham Borough Council both represent Prestbury ward.

See also
Gloucestershire local elections
2016 Cheltenham Borough Council election

References

Locally based political parties in England
Politics of Cheltenham
Politics of Gloucestershire
1976 establishments in England
Political parties established in 1976